Mahmeleh District is a district (bakhsh) in Khonj County, Fars Province, Iran. At the 2006 census, its population was 7,199, in 1,481 families.  The District has no cities. The District has two rural districts (dehestan): Baghan Rural District and Mahmeleh Rural District.

References 

Khonj County
Districts of Fars Province